Bernard Austin may refer to:

 Bernard L. Austin (1902–1979), admiral of the U.S. Navy
 Bernard Austin (politician) (1896–1959), American lawyer and politician from New York